Mabaya is a surname. Notable people with the surname include:

Brice Mabaya (born 1986), Chadian footballer
Jean-Philibert Mabaya (born 1949), Congolese businessman, engineer, and politician

Surnames of African origin